Kaiji is a Japanese manga series written and illustrated by Nobuyuki Fukumoto. It has been serialized in Kodansha's seinen manga magazine Weekly Young Magazine since February 19, 1996. The story centers on Kaiji Itō, a consummate gambler and his misadventures around gambling. The series has currently been divided into six parts; the current part, Tobaku Datenroku Kaiji: 24 Oku Dasshutsu-hen, started in 2017.

In August 2018, it was announced at Otakon that the then brand new North American manga publishing company Denpa licensed the first part of the manga Gambling Apocalypse: Kaiji. It is being released in a six-volume omnibus edition with 500+ pages in each one, and the first volume was published on November 12, 2019.

Part 1: Gambling Apocalypse: Kaiji

Part 2: Tobaku Hakairoku Kaiji

Part 3: Tobaku Datenroku Kaiji

Part 4: Tobaku Datenroku Kaiji: Kazuya-hen

Part 5: Tobaku Datenroku Kaiji: One Poker-hen

Part 6: Tobaku Datenroku Kaiji: 24 Oku Dasshutsu-hen

References